is a railway station on the Osaka Metro Tanimachi Line in Umeda, Kita-ku, Osaka, Japan.  The station is located along Whity Umeda.

Connecting lines from Higashi-Umeda

 (Umeda Station)
  (Nishi-Umeda Station)
 (Ōsaka Station, Kitashinchi Station)
Hankyu Railway (Umeda Station)
Kōbe Line
Takarazuka Line
Kyōto Line
Hanshin Electric Railway Main Line (Umeda Station)

Information
When using regular tickets of Osaka Metro, Surutto Kansai cards, and IC cards (PiTaPa, ICOCA), it is limited to 30 minutes to change to the Midosuji Line and the Yotsubashi Line.
It takes approximately 12 minutes to change to the JR Tozai Line, thus, it is more useful to change to the line at Minami-Morimachi Station.

Layout
There are two side platforms with two tracks on the second basement.  There are two tickets gates in the north for exit from each platform, in the center for entrance to and exit from each platform, and one in the south for entrance to and exit from both platforms.

Around the station
Hanshin Department Store
Hankyu Department Store (Umeda Hankyu Building)
South Gate Building
Daimaru Umeda
Hotel Granvia Osaka
Pokémon Center Osaka
Osaka City Bus Terminal
Kintetsu Bus stop (transit buses for Inada Depot via Kyobashi, and express buses)
Sonezaki Police Station
Asahiya Shoten
Shin-Hankyu Building
Shin-Hankyu Hachibangai
Ohatsu Tenjin
Hankyu Higashi-dori
Whity Umeda
Osaka Ekimae Buildings
Daiyu-ji

External links

 Official Site 
 Official Site

References

Railway stations in Osaka Prefecture
Railway stations in Japan opened in 1967
Osaka Metro stations
Umeda